Frenchglen is an unincorporated small village in Harney County, Oregon, United States.

Frenchglen is near Steens Mountain and Malheur National Wildlife Refuge, and is home to the historic Frenchglen Hotel, an Oregon State Heritage Site built in 1917. In addition to the hotel, which includes a restaurant, the town has a K-8 school divided into two classes, a general store with gas pumps, and a county roads department base. The area is known as a haven for birdwatching.

History
The community is named after the French-Glenn Livestock Company, founded by Hugh J. Glenn and later joined by his son-in-law, Peter French. French-Glenn built its headquarters there in 1872.

Education
The zoned K-8 school is Frenchglen Elementary School (of Frenchglen School District 16). In the 1980-1981 school year there were two students, until one moved away, meaning that towards the end of the school year the school had one student. According to Thomas J. Walsh, a freelance journalist, someone told him that the enrollment was six in 1994, and this had increased to 11 in 1995.

High school students are assigned to Crane Union High School, in Crane, Oregon,  a part of Harney County Union High School District 1J.

Harney County is not in a community college district but has a "contract out of district" (COD) with Treasure Valley Community College. TVCC operates the Burns Outreach Center in Burns.

References

External links

Frenchglen Hotel from Oregon Parks and Recreation Department
History of Frenchglen from Harney County Chamber of Commerce

Gallery

Unincorporated communities in Harney County, Oregon
Unincorporated communities in Oregon